This is a list of male and female German bodybuilders. Germans are classified as citizens of the Federal Republic of Germany.

A 
 Alon Gabbay

B 
Patrick Baboumian
Christa Bauch
Monica Brandt
Tim Budesheim
Adolf Burkhardt

C

E

F

G
Erika Geisen

H
David Hoffmann

I

J
Dennis James

K

L
Anja Langer
Jana Linke-Sippl

M
Ralf Möller

N

O

P

R
Ronny Rockel
Markus Rühl

S
Eugen Sandow
Gunter Schlierkamp
Armin Scholz
Anja Schreiner
Tina Schüßler Kickboxer
Patrick Schulz

T

V

W
Jusup Wilkosz
Kerstin Wöller
Dennis Wolf

Y

See also
 List of British bodybuilders
 List of female professional bodybuilders
 List of male professional bodybuilders

References

External links

Professional bodybuilding
German
Bodybuilding
 List